Jennifer Lynn Allard (born 1968) is a former All-American softball player at the University of Michigan and the current head coach of the Harvard University softball team.  Allard played for the Michigan Wolverines softball team from 1987–1990, where she was named an All-Big Ten player four straight years.  She was a third baseman as a freshman and sophomore and a pitcher as a junior and senior.  In 1989, Allard was named the Big Ten Player of the Year and a nominee for the Honda-Broderick Cup. She has been the head coach at Harvard since 1995, where she led the Crimson to its first Ivy League championship in 1992 and has followed with three more Ivy League crowns.  In 1997, Allard told her team that she was a lesbian, becoming one of the first major college coaches to openly announce her homosexuality.  In 2008, Allard was inducted into the University of Michigan Athletic Hall of Honor.

All-American at the University of Michigan (1987–1990)
After graduating from Woodbridge High School in Irvine, California, Allard played softball for Hall of Fame coach Carol Hutchins at the University of Michigan from 1987-1990.  She began at Michigan as a third baseman, but became a pitcher in her junior and senior years.  As a freshman, Allard led the Wolverines with 26 RBIs, while hitting .331, second best on the team.  She led the team in batting average in 1988 and 1989 and was named an All-American and Big Ten Player of the Year in 1989.  She was also a four-time All-Big Ten Conference selection, earning Academic All-Big Ten honors as a senior.  In 1989, Allard was also nominated for the Honda Broderick Award. She was the recipient of Michigan’s Conference Medal of Honor, an award given to the highest-achieving female student-athlete.  Named to the Big Ten All-Decade team in 1992, Allard ranked in the top four all-time in 15 hitting and pitching categories at the time of her graduation from Michigan.  In 2008, Allard was inducted into the University of Michigan Athletic Hall of Honor, only the fourth softball player inducted into the Hall (after Penny Neer, Vicki Morrow, and Alicia Seegert).

Head coach at Harvard (1995–2015)

In 1992, Allard accepted a full-time coaching position as an assistant coach at the University of Iowa. In 1995, Allard accepted the head coaching position for the Harvard University softball team.  She has been the head coach at Harvard for 21 seasons, compiling a career record of 536-400-3, and is the longest tenured softball coach in the Ivy League.    She holds 313-249-1 overall record at Harvard, including a 127-49 record in the Ivy League.   Harvard has won four Ivy League softball titles in its history, all during Allard’s time as coach.  Allard has also been Harvard’s coach during each of its four 30-win seasons and its three NCAA Championship berths. She has coached 33 first-team All-Ivy League players selections, four Ivy League Players of the Year, three Ivy Pitchers of the Year and two Ivy Rookies of the Year.

In 1998, Allard led Harvard to the best season in the history of the program, as the team recorded a 34-22 record, captured its first Ivy League championship with a perfect 12–0 league record and earned its first bid to the NCAA Championship, where it defeated Boston College in the regional.  The Crimson was led in 1998 by Ivy Player of the Year Tara LaSovage and Pitcher of the Year Tasha Cupp.

In 2000, Allard’s team won its second Ivy League championship and NCAA tournament berth.  The 2000 Crimson went 11-1 in league play.  In 2001, Harvard again won the Ivy League title after posting an 11–3 League record.  In 2002, the team had a 31-10 record in 2002, breaking the record set by the 1998 team, and winning the ECAC championship.  In 2007, Harvard won its fourth Ivy League championship under Allard with a record of 31–15 record and a 14–6 record in the Conference. Harvard also won back-to-back Ivy championships in 2011 and 2012.

Allard earned a master's degree from the Harvard School of Education in 1999 and a master's in psychology from the Harvard Extension School in 2003.

Personal life
In 1997, Allard told her team that she was a lesbian, becoming one of the first major college coaches to openly affirm her homosexuality.  Allard made the announcement to her players in an email.  "What I wrote," Allard recalled, "was something like, 'I know you'll potentially be stopping by my suite or calling, and I just want to let you know that my partner has decided to move on campus with me and you'll soon get the opportunity to meet her.'"   She added, "I wanted to be very honest about how I was living and not be shamed or silenced by it.  I ask and expect my athletes to be honest about things. They don't have to tell me everything, but if they are going to tell me something, I want them to be truthful. And because I want to model that, I couldn't tell them I'm hiding my partner behind the left field fence and I'm embarrassed to have them know her."   Allard has spoken at conferences on the subject of homosexuality in athletics and has become an advocate for the rights of gay and lesbian athletes.  "As a coach, I'd like to see increased dialogue among teams, and resources for gay athletes need to come more to the forefront," she said. "It's a big learning experience to have a gay athlete on the team."

See also
University of Michigan Athletic Hall of Honor

Notes

1960s births
Living people
Softball coaches from California
Michigan Wolverines softball players
Iowa Hawkeyes softball coaches
Harvard Crimson softball coaches
Harvard Extension School alumni
Harvard Graduate School of Education alumni
Lesbian sportswomen
American LGBT sportspeople
LGBT people from California
Sportspeople from Irvine, California
Softball players from California
LGBT softball players